Current River Cavern is a show cave located in one mile west of Van Buren, MO on U.S. Route 60. The cave is located inside Cave Spring Park. 
The cave was first opened as a show cave in 1940 under the name "Cave Spring Onyx Caverns".

Current River Cavern was formed exclusively by the stream that still runs through the cave; a rarity among Missouri caves. The cave is set in the Eminence Dolomite.

The commercial section of the cave extends 240 ft before ending at a flooded passage. A 1996 survey reported 2,384 ft of passages extending far beyond the commercial section. The owners are seeking an alternative entrance and hope to open more of the cave to visitors in the future.

Current River Cavern is the first show cave to use all battery powered, wireless LED lights for illumination. The LED lights do not promote algae growth or harm cave life. In addition, the lack of wires through the cave creates a more safe and natural experience.

See also
Caves of Missouri

References

External links 
 

Caves of Missouri
Landforms of Carter County, Missouri
Show caves in the United States
Roadside attractions in Missouri
Tourist attractions in Carter County, Missouri
1940 establishments in Missouri